Isneauville is a commune in the Seine-Maritime department in the Normandy region in northern France.

Geography
The A28 autoroute forms the south-eastern border of the commune.

Population

Places of interest
 The church of St. Germain, dating from the thirteenth century.
 An ancient dovecote.
 The sixteenth century Château des Cinq Bonnets.

See also
Communes of the Seine-Maritime department

References

External links

The official website of Isneauville 

Communes of Seine-Maritime